Enrico Gasparotto (born 22 March 1982) is an Italian-born Swiss former professional road racing cyclist, who rode professionally between 2005 and 2020, for seven different teams. After retiring, he worked as a directeur sportif for UCI Continental team  in 2021 before joining  in a similar role the following year.

Career
At the 2007 Giro d'Italia, Gasparotto led his Liquigas squad to a stage 1 team time trial win and wore the pink jersey the following day.

One week later, he took part in Liège–Bastogne–Liège, finishing third by beating a small group to the sprint in a race won by fellow  teammate, Maxim Iglinsky.

At the Vuelta a España, bad luck hit Gasparotto and the  squad on the very first stage, a  team time trial held in Pamplona. His teammates Paolo Tiralongo, Alexsandr Dyachenko, Andrey Zeits and Gasparotto himself crashed in an accident that was not picked up by the television cameras. His teammates could pick themselves up and continue, as did Gasparotto, but it was revealed that his collarbone was fractured in three places and he had to abandon the Spanish race.

Gasparotto took a second Amstel Gold triumph when he won the 2016 edition of the race, defeating Michael Valgren in a two-up sprint after the pair broke away from the main group in the closing stages of the race. It was Gasparotto's first win since his 2012 victory, and he dedicated it to Antoine Demoitié, his teammate who had died after a crash at Gent–Wevelgem the previous month.

Major results

2004
 1st Stage 5 Giro del Friuli-Venezia Giulia
 3rd Gran Premio di Poggiana
2005
 1st  Road race, Italian National Road Championships
 1st Stage 2 Volta a Catalunya
 3rd Overall Uniqa Classic
 5th Coppa Bernocchi
 6th Gran Premio Città di Misano – Adriatico
 10th Paris–Tours
2006
 1st Memorial Cimurri
 3rd Coppa Sabatini
 6th Scheldeprijs
2007
 Giro d'Italia
1st Stage 1 (TTT)
Held  after Stages 1 & 3
 2nd Overall Danmark Rundt
 4th Brabantse Pijl
 Vuelta a Mallorca
5th Trofeo Mallorca
9th Trofeo Cala Millor
 9th Memorial Cimurri
2008
 1st  Overall Ster Elektrotoer
1st Stage 3
 1st Giro della Romagna
 2nd Overall Tirreno–Adriatico
 2nd Coppa Placci
 3rd Overall Three Days of De Panne
1st Stage 1
 3rd Gran Premio di Lugano
 4th Trofeo Laigueglia
 5th Gran Premio Bruno Beghelli
 6th Overall Giro della Provincia di Grosseto
 7th Overall Tour du Poitou-Charentes
 7th Brabantse Pijl
 10th Overall Danmark Rundt
2009
 1st  Sprints classification, Tour de Suisse
 2nd Overall Giro della Provincia di Grosseto
 3rd Coppa Bernocchi
 8th Memorial Cimurri
2010
 1st Stage 5 Tirreno–Adriatico
 3rd Amstel Gold Race
 9th Montepaschi Strade Bianche
2011
 4th Tre Valli Varesine
2012
 1st Amstel Gold Race
 3rd Liège–Bastogne–Liège
 7th Trofeo Laigueglia
2013
 5th Giro di Lombardia
 6th Liège–Bastogne–Liège
 7th Grand Prix Cycliste de Montréal
 9th Amstel Gold Race
2014
 8th Amstel Gold Race
 8th Grand Prix Cycliste de Québec
 9th Grand Prix Cycliste de Montréal
 9th Tre Valli Varesine
2015
 8th Amstel Gold Race
 8th Grand Prix of Aargau Canton
 9th Coppa Ugo Agostoni
2016
 1st Amstel Gold Race
 2nd Brabantse Pijl
 5th La Flèche Wallonne
 6th Overall Tour of Belgium
2018
 3rd Amstel Gold Race
 3rd Gran Premio di Lugano
 3rd Coppa Ugo Agostoni
 6th Liège–Bastogne–Liège
2019
 7th Brabantse Pijl
 9th Overall Arctic Race of Norway
 10th La Flèche Wallonne

Grand Tour general classification results timeline

Classics results

References

External links

Palmares on Cycling Base 

1982 births
Living people
People from Sacile
Italian male cyclists
Swiss male cyclists
Cyclists from Friuli Venezia Giulia
Directeur sportifs